Intelligent Thought: Science Versus the Intelligent Design Movement is a 2006 book edited by John Brockman and published by Vintage Books.  The book is a series of essays which discuss the idea that natural selection and evolution helps explain the world better than intelligent design.  The contributors are  Daniel Dennett, Scott Atran, Steven Pinker, Nicholas Humphrey, Tim White, Neil Shubin, Marc Hauser, Richard Dawkins, Jerry Coyne, Leonard Susskind, Frank Sulloway,  Lee Smolin, Stuart A. Kauffman, Seth Lloyd, Lisa Randall,  and Scott Sampson.

Notes

See also 
List of scientific societies rejecting intelligent design

2006 non-fiction books
2006 anthologies
Essay anthologies
Books by John Brockman
Intelligent design books
Criticism of intelligent design
Vintage Books books
English-language books